Baasch is a German surname. Notable people with the surname include:
 Johannes Baasch (1905–1944), German World War II officer
 Ulrich Baasch (1890–?), German-Russian athlete
 Baasch (musician), a Polish musician

See also
 Braasch

German-language surnames